Holly Springs is a city in Cherokee County, Georgia, United States. The population was 9,189 as of the 2010 census, up from 3,195 in 2000.

History
The Georgia General Assembly incorporated the place in 1906 as the Town of Holly Springs. According to tradition, the city was named from a stand of holly trees near a spring at the original town site.

Geography
Holly Springs is located south of the center of Cherokee County at  (34.166478, -84.501016). It is bordered by Canton, the county seat, to the north, and by Woodstock to the south. Interstate 575 passes through the city, with access from exits 11 and 14.

Neighboring unincorporated communities
Hickory Flat (east)
Toonigh (southeast)
Lebanon (south)
Sixes (west) - home to Fort Sixes, an 1830s Indian removal fort

Demographics

2020 census

As of the 2020 United States census, there were 16,213 people, 4,145 households, and 3,205 families residing in the city.

2000 census
As of the census of 2000, there were 3,195 people, 1,136 households, and 892 families residing in the city. The racial makeup of the city was 94.80% White, 1.16% African American, 0.66% Native American, 0.75% Asian, 0.03% Pacific Islander, 1.44% from other races, and 1.16% from two or more races. Hispanic or Latino of any race were 4.82% of the population.

There were 1,136 households, out of which 45.6% had children under the age of 18 living with them, 66.9% were married couples living together, 7.7% had a female householder with no husband present, and 21.4% were non-families. 16.3% of all households were made up of individuals, and 3.3% had someone living alone who was 65 years of age or older.  The average household size was 2.81 and the average family size was 2.16.

In the city, the population was spread out, with 30.1% under the age of 18, 7.3% from 18 to 24, 40.8% from 25 to 44, 16.7% from 45 to 64, and 5.0% who were 65 years of age or older.  The median age was 31 years. For every 100 females, there were 103.1 males.  For every 100 females age 18 and over, there were 111.2 males.

The median income for a household in the city was $57,019, and the median income for a family was $61,651. Males had a median income of $40,717 versus $26,823 for females. The per capita income for the city was $22,992.  About 0.8% of families and 1.3% of the population were below the poverty line, including 1.6% of those under age 18 and none of those age 65 or over.

References

External links

City of Holly Springs official website
Cherokee Today

Cities in Georgia (U.S. state)
Cities in Cherokee County, Georgia